The 2003 season was São Paulo's 74th season since club's existence. In this year São Paulo became a runner-up of Campeonato Paulista, being defeated by rival Corinthians in finals. At the Copa do Brasil, national cup, reached the quarterfinals falling in front of Goiás due Away goal rule with 0–0 (away); 1–1 (home). The club arrived in third place final in the first time when Série A was disputed in accumulated points system. In his first participation in Copa Sudamericana reached semifinals losing to Argentine club River Plate in penalty shootouts for 2–4 in a match that had fights and aggressions between players of both teams. The featured of year was the striker Luís Fabiano which scored 46 goals in whole season, 29 only in league.

Squad

Final squad

Statistics

Scorers

Managers performance

Overall

{|class="wikitable"
|-
|Games played || 76 (11 Campeonato Paulista, 8 Copa do Brasil, 46 Campeonato Brasileiro, 8 Copa Sudamericana, 3 Friendly match)
|-
|Games won || 40 (6 Campeonato Paulista, 4 Copa do Brasil, 22 Campeonato Brasileiro, 6 Copa Sudamericana, 2 Friendly match)
|-
|Games drawn || 18 (2 Campeonato Paulista, 3 Copa do Brasil, 12 Campeonato Brasileiro, 1 Copa Sudamericana, 1 Friendly match)
|-
|Games lost || 17 (3 Campeonato Paulista, 1 Copa do Brasil, 12 Campeonato Brasileiro, 1 Copa Sudamericana, 0 Friendly match)
|-
|Goals scored || 153
|-
|Goals conceded || 98
|-
|Goal difference || +55
|-
|Best result || 6–0 (H) v Juventus – Campeonato Paulista – 2003.1.30 6–0 (H) v São Raimundo (AM) – Copa do Brasil – 2003.3.13
|-
|Worst result || 2–5 (A) v Paysandu – Campeonato Brasileiro – 2003.4.27
|-
|Top scorer || Luís Fabiano (46 goals)
|-

Friendlies

Official competitions

Campeonato Paulista

Record

Copa do Brasil

Record

Campeonato Brasileiro

Record

Copa Sudamericana

Record

External links
official website 

Brazilian football clubs 2003 season
2003